New Jersey's 3rd congressional district is represented by Democrat Andy Kim of Moorestown who has served in Congress since 2019. 

Under the 2020 census map, the 3rd district lost all of its towns in Ocean County, and gained several towns in Burlington County, Mercer County, and Monmouth County.

Counties and municipalities in the district
For the 118th and successive Congresses (based on redistricting following the 2020 Census), the district contains all or portions of three counties and 53 municipalities.

Burlington County (38):
Bass River, Beverly, Bordentown City, Bordentown Township, Burlington City, Burlington Township, Chesterfield Township, Cinnaminson Township, Delanco Township, Delran Township, Eastampton Township, Edgewater Park Township, Evesham Township, Fieldsboro, Florence Township, Hainesport Township, Lumberton Township, Mansfield Township, Medford Lakes, Medford Township, Moorestown Township, Mount Holly Township, Mount Laurel Township, New Hanover Township, North Hanover Township, Pemberton Borough, Pemberton Township, Riverside Township, Riverton Borough, Shamong Township, Southampton Township, Springfield Township, Tabernacle Township, Washington Township, Westampton Township, Willingboro Township, Woodland Township and Wrightstown

Mercer County (5):
East Windsor, Hamilton, Hightstown, Lawrence, and Robbinsville.

Monmouth County (10):
Allentown, Englishtown, Freehold Borough, Freehold Township (part; also 4th),  Holmdel, Manalapan, Marlboro,  Millstone, Roosevelt, and Upper Freehold

Recent election results in statewide races 
Results Under Current Lines (Since 2023)

Results Under Old Lines

List of members representing the district

1799–1801: One seat

1813–1815: Two seats 
From 1813 to 1815, two seats were apportioned, elected at-large on a general ticket. This district was organized from New Jersey's At-large congressional district.

District organized to New Jersey's At-large congressional district in 1815

1843–present: One seat

Recent election results

2012

2014

2016

2018

2020

2022

References

 Congressional Biographical Directory of the United States 1774–present

External links 

 Ballotpedia - New Jersey's 3rd Congressional District

03
Burlington County, New Jersey
Camden County, New Jersey
Ocean County, New Jersey
Constituencies established in 1799
1799 establishments in New Jersey
Constituencies disestablished in 1801
1801 disestablishments in New Jersey
Constituencies established in 1813
1813 establishments in New Jersey
Constituencies disestablished in 1815
1815 disestablishments in New Jersey
Constituencies established in 1843
1843 establishments in New Jersey